Jacek Kopczyński (born 11 August 1971) is a Polish actor. He also provides voice-overs on television programs, like those broadcast on Hyper+. He is most known as the original voice of Dandelion (Jaskier) in The Witcher video games.

In 1994 he graduated from the Acting Department at the Polish National Film, Television and Theatre School in Łódź. From 1994 to 1999 he worked at the Dramatic Theatre in Warsaw, and is currently not connected permanently to any theater.

He is married to Patrycja Markowska, with whom he has a son (born 9 January 2008).

External links 
 
 Jacek Kopczyński on filmweb.pl
 Jacek Kopczyński on filmpolski.pl
 Jacek Kopczyński on e-teatr.pl

1971 births
Living people
Actors from Łódź
Łódź Film School alumni
Polish male film actors
Polish male stage actors
Polish male voice actors